John Dorney is a British writer and actor best known for stage roles at theatres including the National Theatre, the BBC Radio 4 sitcom My First Planet; and his scripts for the Big Finish Doctor Who range. His script Solitaire was rated the most popular Doctor Who Companion Chronicle of 2010 on the Timescales website and was the runner up in Unreality Sci-fi net's poll for Story of the Year 2010–11. His script Iterations of I won the Scribe Award for best spin-off audio drama of 2014 and his script “The Red Lady” won the same award in 2015. His script “Absent Friends” won a BBC Audio Drama award, and the co-authored script for ‘Stranded 1’ won an Audie. 

As well as Doctor Who, he has written for Big Finish's Sapphire and Steel series and on radio co-wrote three series of BBC Radio 4's Recorded for Training Purposes. He won the BBC Show Me the Funny 'Sketch Factor' competition, was a finalist in the BBC 'Laughing Stock' competition, and has performed in Mark Watson's Edinburgh Comedy Award-winning long shows as 'The Balladeer'. On stage, he has written plays for the Royal Court Theatre, Hampstead and Soho Theatres.

He trained at LAMDA.

Writing credits

Acting credits (selected)

References

External links 
 Humble Boy reviewed in The Stage
 Jack and the Beanstalk review
 The Caretaker review
 Beauty and the Beast review
 John Dorney profile on What's On Stage
 London Classic Theatre production notes
 BBC Radio 4's Recorded for Training Purposes

Living people
Year of birth missing (living people)
21st-century British male writers
British science fiction writers
British male dramatists and playwrights
British dramatists and playwrights
British male stage actors
British male television actors